Rumeshkan County or Rūmeshgān County is in Lorestan province, Iran. The capital of the county is the city of Chaqabol. At the 2006 census, the region's population (as Rumeshkhan District of Kuhdasht County) was 35,595 in 7,423 households. The following census in 2011 counted 38,701 people in 9,449 households. The district was separated from the county in April 2013 to form Rumeshkhan County. The first governor was appointed in February the following year. At the 2016 census, the county's population was 39,058 in 10,742 households.

History
Archaeological evidence shows the influence of Roman style architecture, and the name of this region is a compound of the words Rum (Romans) and eshkan (break) and it is believed that this area is where Eastern Roman Empire was defeated.

Administrative divisions

The population history and structural changes of Rumeshkhan County's administrative divisions over three consecutive censuses are shown in the following table. The latest census shows two districts, four rural districts, and one city.

Geography and climate
Rumeshkan County lies between 32 degrees 15 minutes to 33 degrees 25 minutes north latitude, and between 47 degrees 20 minutes to 47 degrees 40 minutes east longitude. The county is mountainous with major northwest to southeast trending ranges. The lower plains are generally high desert steppe.

Average annual rainfall is 450 mm.

Economy
The principle occupations in Rumeshkan County are animal husbandry, and farming in the river valleys. Most of the crops are cereals, especially barley and wheat. In many of the villages and around Chaqabol, deep wells provide for irrigated agriculture and vegetable and melons are grown. These become a cash crop near Chaqabol and where transportation is available to other cities.  In some areas orchards have been planted. In the 21st century, Rumeshkan began to experience severe drought which has decreased agricultural production and impoverished some farmers.

In 2015 the government in cooperation with the private sector opened a steel mill.

Scenic areas
 Drvnshr Cave (غار درونشر), a limestone cave with a variety of cave formations.
 Kalmakareh Cave has been occupied by humans since pre-historic time and has yielded up artifacts from several civilizations.
 Zagheh Castle (قلعه زاخه), two kilometers east of Chaqabol, is a ruin of a Roman fort with later Sassanid additions.
 Mount Vyznhar (Vznyar) is the highest mountain in the county. On its slopes are the ruins of Kohzad Castle.

See also

 Romans in Persia

References

Further reading 

 

Counties of Lorestan Province